Guilin West railway station, serves the city of Guilin, in Guangxi.  It is a stop on the Guiyang–Guangzhou high-speed railway.

Services

Guilin West railway station is located in the north-north-western periphery of Guilin and primarily served by services passing between Guiyang and Guangzhou on the Guiyang–Guangzhou high-speed railway,  enabling a long detour through central Guilin to be avoided.

References 

Railway stations in Guangxi
Buildings and structures in Guilin